The Battle of Loyew was a battle of the Khmelnytsky Uprising. Near the site of the present-day town of Loyew in Belarus, a numerically superior force of Ukrainian Cossacks under the command of Cossack warleaders Stepan Pobodailo and Mykhailo Krychevsky was defeated by the Polish–Lithuanian Commonwealth forces under the command of Field Hetman of Lithuania Janusz Radziwiłł. Radziwiłł was able to engage the Cossack forces before they merged. First, he defeated the army of Krychevsky, who was mortally wounded; then he defeated Pobodailo's army.

Before the battle
A Cossack army under Stepan Pobodailo with a force of about 7,000 took Loyew in summer of 1649 and began using it as an operational base in the region, from which they staged a series of pillaging raids. Field Hetman of Lithuania Janusz Radziwiłł took the Lithuanian army (about 6,000 strong, including about 800 Winged hussars, 1,000 infantry, the rest, lighter cavalry) in the field to challenge him.

Bohdan Khmelnytsky, leader of the Ukrainian Cossacks, learned about Radziwiłł's plans while besieging Zbarazh. He sent part of his forces, an army of about 10,000, under another Cossack leader, Mykhailo Krychevsky (Stanisław Krzeczowski), to support Podobajła against the Commonwealth.

On 23 July the Commonwealth army approached Loyew on the right bank of the Dnieper River.  Pobodailo's fortified camp was on the left, and Radziwiłł decided to start a siege by shelling the Cossack's camp with his artillery over the river.

Battle
When Radziwiłł learned of the approaching Cossack reinforcements under Krychevsky, he sent 2,000 of his cavalry to scout the enemy, but Krychevsky avoided them and attacked the main Commonwealth army. The Cossack assault was however broken by Commonwealth artillery and infantry fire. Radziwiłł then assaulted the Cossacks with his cavalry, but it was encircled by the Cossacks and would have been destroyed if the rest of the Commonwealth cavalry, returning from the failed scouting mission, hadn't arrived at that moment and turned the tables.

The remains of Krychevsky's army took up positions in a wagon fort. Initial attempts by the Commonwealth army to take the new Cossack positions failed. In the meantime, Pobodailo's troops crossed the river to help their allies, but were defeated by the Commonwealth. After that, the Commonwealth's final assault on the wagon fort succeeded, with the hussars dismounting and taking to battle on foot. Krychevsky, mortally wounded, was taken prisoner. Radziwiłł collected about 40 Cossack banner from the field. Samuel Orgelbrand gave Cossack losses at 3,000 men, 2 artillery pieces and 12 banners.

One of the reasons for the defeat of the Cossack army and the significant losses was a strategic mistake of Krychevsky, who misjudged the factor of suddenness which allowed the Commonwealth army to destroy each unit of the Cossack army separately.

Aftermath
Commonwealth forces retook control of the region, but lack of supplies prevented Radziwiłł from advancing on Kiev.

Radziwiłl was rewarded by the king with possessions at Nevel, Sebezh and Krasne. Not content with those rewards, he would later betray the Commonwealth.

Another battle would take place in the same area two years later.

References

Loyew 1649
1649 in Europe
Loyew
Gomel Region